Muurame church, located in Muurame, central Finland, was designed by the Finnish architect Alvar Aalto, and completed in 1929.

Architecture
It was the first Aalto-designed church, and the only one of his many church designs in the 1920s, to be built, and represents his transition from Nordic Classicism to the Functionalist style he is mostly known for. As a transitional work, the Muurame church has been undervalued among Aalto's designs by many critics, and even the architect himself called it his 'aberration of youth' (nuoruudensynti).

The church's elongated-nave, single-aisle design and campanile (belfry) were influenced by Aalto's honeymoon trip to Italy a few years earlier, and the churches he saw there.

Renovation
The church was comprehensively restored in 2016 to its original design. Most notably, the interior colour scheme was changed from its pre-renovation white and light wood — often associated with Aalto's minimalist style — to the original, more colourful one consisting of bright blue and red ceiling and dark grey fixtures.

References

External links
Muurame Church on Alvar Aalto Foundation website

Alvar Aalto buildings
Alvar Aalto churches
Churches completed in 1929
Lutheran churches in Finland
Muurame